Drylongso is a 1992 children's book by Virginia Hamilton and illustrator Jerry Pinkney. It is about a farming family who is experiencing a drought and takes in a stranger.

Reception
School Library Journal, in a review of Drylongso, wrote "As in many of her other works of fiction, Hamilton combines myth and realism to create a poignant, powerful tale. ..  Pinkney's illustrations are exquisite, expressive, and perfectly in tune with the tone and spirit of the text." and concluded "Despite the occasional seams, this is a fine book." Booklist wrote "In an understated story of drought and hard times and longing for rain, a great writer and a great artist have pared down their rich, exuberant styles to something quieter but no less intense." and Publishers Weekly called it a "thoroughly captivating story firmly rooted in the folktale tradition." 

Drylongso has also been reviewed by Kirkus Reviews, The Horn Book Magazine, and the Smithsonian.

References

1992 novels
1992 children's books
American children's novels
American picture books
Picture books by Jerry Pinkney
Literature by African-American women